The Jaitmatang, also spelled Yaithmathang, are an Indigenous Australian people of the State of Victoria.

Name
Jaitmatang/Yaithmathang, according to the early ethnographer Alfred William Howitt, may have derived from Ya-yau their word for "yes," and thang ("speech/tongue").

Language
Ian D. Clark, after subjecting evidence for the Omeo languages in early wordlists, identified a distinctive tongue differing substantially from those – Dhudhuroa and Pallanganmiddang – spoken by tribes to the immediate north. After then examining whether it might be a variety of Ngarigu or had a separate name Harold Koch and others consider it a southern variety of the Yuin sub-branch of the Yuin-Kuric language family. Koch's analysis points to a possibility that the Jaitmatang, like their neighbours the Wolgal and the Ngarigo, spoke dialects of one language, with Clark considering it a dialect of Ngarigo.

Country
To the south their tribal boundaries ran to Omeo and Mount Delusion, 25 miles north of Omeo.

Social organization
Hordes:-

 Kandangoramittung (horde on the Omeo plains)
 The Djilamatang were considered by early authorities to have been a hordes of the Jaitmathang.
 According to Robert Hamilton Mathews, Alfred William Howitt's reference to a "Theddora horde"  actually denoted a distinct tribal grouping, Dhudhuroa. Norman Tindale separates them, though noting that Aldo Massola supported the traditional view that the Jaitmatang and Dhudhuroa belonged to the same tribal unity.

The Jaitmathang had an annual migratory cycle, camping on the lower plateaus of their land through the colder, winter period, and then, once the snow began to melt, shifting into the highlands to pass the summer hunting in the alpine zone.

History of contact
The Jaitmathang lands were first penetrated and settlements began to be established there, in 1828. Following the Victorian gold rush, miners also discovered gold in the Omeo area, at Livingstone Creek, off the Mitta Mitta River, and as the news spread, a large mass of gold-diggers rushed to settle and pan the waters of the area. Within a decade, by 1862, only 4-5 Jaitmathang could be counted who had survived the disruption.

Alternative names

 Ya-itma-thang
 Yaithmathang
 Muddhang (Mitta Mitta horde)
 Mudthang
 Kandangoramittung (horde on the Omeo plains)
 Jandangara
 Gundanara, Gundanora
 Brajerak (rude exonym for them used by coastal tribes).

Notes

Citations

Sources

Aboriginal peoples of Victoria (Australia)
History of Victoria (Australia)